The 294th Infantry Division was a German infantry division in World War II that participated in the invasion of Yugoslavia. The 294th Infantry Division was amalgamated with the 513th Infantry Regiment to create the 513th Grenadier Regiment, on October 15, 1942.
The division was destroyed by the end of August 1944 during the Soviet Jassy–Kishinev Offensive and its commander killed.

Organization 
Structure of the division:

 Headquarters
 294th Reconnaissance Battalion
 513th Infantry Regiment
 514th Infantry Regiment
 515th Infantry Regiment
 294th Field Replacement Battalion
 294th Engineer Battalion
 294th Artillery Regiment
 294th Tank Destroyer Battalion
 294th Signal Battalion
 294th Divisional Supply Group

Commanding officers
Generalleutnant Otto Gabcke, 13 February 1940 – 22 March 1942 , killed in action
General der Infanterie Johannes Block, 22 March 1942 – 12 August 1943
Generalmajor Hermann Frenking, 12 August – 24 December 1943
Generalmajor Werner von Eichstedt, 24 December 1943 – 26 August 1944 (KIA)

Notes

References
 

Infantry divisions of Germany during World War II
Military units and formations of Germany in Yugoslavia in World War II
Military units and formations established in 1940
Military units and formations disestablished in 1944